Benoît Bernard (born 17 October 1969) is a French sprint canoer. He competed from the late 1980s to the mid-1990s.

Bernard won three medals at the ICF Canoe Sprint World Championships with a silver (C-4 500 m: 1991) and two bronzes (C-4 200 m: 1995, C-4 500 m: 1989).

In 2009, he signed a petition in support of Roman Polanski, calling for his release after Polanski was arrested in Switzerland in relation to his 1977 charge for drugging and raping a 13-year-old girl.

References

French male canoeists
Living people
ICF Canoe Sprint World Championships medalists in Canadian
1969 births